Troglochaetus is a genus of polychaetes belonging to the family Nerillidae.

The species of this genus are found in Europe and Northern America.

Species:

Troglochaetus beranecki 
Troglochaetus simplex

References

Polychaetes